Haylands is an area just to the south of Ryde on the Isle of Wight, off the south coast of England. At the time of the 2011 Census the population etc. of Haylands is listed under Ryde. Located to the east, it is a short walk away from housing estates at Pell and Binstead.
The settlement consists mainly of a housing development, including some ex-local authority housing, a corner shop in Upton Road, a primary and a middle school. It is not far from Ryde High School at Pell Lane. In the centre of Haylands there is a pub called Lake Huron. The pub's name originates from the Lake family, a 19th-century family of brewers who owned several pubs naming them after the Great Lakes of North America, Lake Huron is the only one to have survived.
Haylands forms part of the local electoral ward of Havenstreet, Ashey and Haylands and at the Isle of Wight Council election in 2009 elected Independent councillor Vanessa Churchman.
The settlement lies to the west of the A3055 road. Southern Vectis route 4 used to link the area with Ryde and East Cowes. However this caused the journey time to increase significantly and the area was later withdrawn from the service and after negotiations a limited replacement service was put in place. This service was later improved and is now run as route 37.

References

Hamlets on the Isle of Wight